The 2013 NAB AFL Under 18 Championships was the 18th edition of the AFL Under 18 Championships. Eight teams competed in the championships: Vic Metro, Vic Country, South Australia and Western Australia in Division 1, and New South Wales/Australian Capital Territory (NSW/ACT), Northern Territory, Queensland and Tasmania in Division 2. The competition was played over five rounds, in seven states and territories, across two divisions. In the first two rounds of the competition, the second-division teams crossed over and played the division one sides, while the final three rounds of matches were played between the teams in each the division. South Australia and Tasmania were the Division 1 and Division 2 champions, respectively. The Larke Medal (for the best player in Division 1) was awarded to Western Australia's Dom Sheed, and the Hunter Harrison Medal (for the best player in Division 2) was shared between three players—Queensland's Liam Dawson and Tasmania's Kade Kolodjashnij and Toby Nankervis.

Fixtures

Round 1

Round 2

Round 3

Round 4

Round 5

All-Australian team
The 2013 Under 18 All-Australian team was named on 9 July 2013:

References

Under-18